KTBB-FM (97.5 MHz) is a commercial radio station licensed to Troup, Texas, serving the Tyler-Longview market with a news/talk format. The station is owned by Paul Gleiser, through licensee ATW Media, LLC.,and is in full simulcast with co-owned KTBB 600 AM.

Studios for KTBB-AM and FM are co-located with KRWR in One American Center at 909 ESE Loop 323, at the intersection with New Copeland Road; the transmitter is on County Road 246 South in Tyler, Texas.

Programming
On weekdays, KTBB-AM-FM features two hours of news in the morning and an hour of news and information in the afternoon drive time.  The remainder of the weekday schedule consists of syndicated conservative talk shows, including The Glenn Beck Program, Fox News Radio’s Fox Across America with Jimmy Failla, The Sean Hannity Show, The Mark Levin Show, The Jim Bohannon Show, Coast to Coast AM with George Noory and This Morning, America's First News with Gordon Deal.

Weekends feature programs about money, health, religion, real estate, fishing and hunting, guns, cars, farming, home repair, gardening, pets, and technology.  Weekend hosts include Kim Komando and repeats of weekday shows.  Most hours begin with world and national news from Fox News Radio.

History
KWRW began broadcasting in 1981, licensed to Rusk, Texas. The station originally broadcast at 97.7 MHz and was owned by State Representative Emmett Holman Whitehead. KWRW featured a full-service format with contemporary music, specialty shows, and news during the first six years of operation. The original call letters, KWRW, were chosen by Representative and Mrs. Whitehead in honor of their daughter, Dr. Wendee Whitehead. KWRW was originally licensed at 3,000 watts from the KTLU tower in Rusk. In order to extend KWRW's signal beyond Cherokee County, Whitehead applied for and was granted a relay translator at 103.9 FM, licensed as K280CL Palestine in 1985. In addition, KWRW upgraded to 25,000 watts prior to its city of license change to Troup.

On January 15, 2009, KWRW changed formats from oldies to classic hits and rebranded as "Classic Hits 97.7".

KWRW and K280CL remained together for almost 20 years until Whitehead's passing and subsequent transfer of KWRW, the relay translator, and sister AM station KTLU to The Cherokeean Herald.

KWRW was later purchased by Paul Gleiser in March 2015. As part of the purchase, a request to move the KWRW facility from Rusk to Troup was applied for and granted by the Federal Communications Commission. The current 97.5 Troup facility began broadcasting as KTBB-FM on May 15, 2015. K280CL subsequently moved from Palestine to Rusk and became the translator for KTLU 1580 AM Jacksonville.

References

External links

TBB-FM
News and talk radio stations in the United States
Radio stations established in 1981